Southland (often known as the Southland Stags) are a New Zealand professional rugby union team based in Invercargill, New Zealand. The union was originally established in 1887, with the National Provincial Championship established in 1976. They now play in the reformed National Provincial Championship competition. They play their home games at Rugby Park Stadium in Invercargill in the Southland region. The team is affiliated with the Highlanders Super Rugby franchise. Their home playing colours are maroon and gold.

Current squad

The Southland Stags squad for the 2022 Bunnings NPC is:

Honours

Southland have never been overall Champions. Their full list of honours, though, include:

National Provincial Championship Second Division South Island
Winners: 1982, 1984

National Provincial Championship Second Division
Winners: 1989, 1994, 1996

Current Super Rugby players
Players named in the 2022 Southland Stags squad, who also earned contracts or were named in a squad for any side participating in the 2022 Super Rugby Pacific season.

References

External links
Official site

National Provincial Championship
New Zealand rugby union teams
Sport in Southland, New Zealand